, also known as Ohzora Shuppan is a josei manga publisher in Japan, founded in 1990. Headquartered in Tokyo, Japan, it publishes Japanese manga, manga magazines and comic anthologies. Kitawaki also ran affiliated American company Aurora Publishing, established in 2006 before it closed in 2010. Aurora Publishing was the U.S. subsidiary of Ohzora.

Magazines 
 Cool-B
 P-mate
 DIVAS
 Harlequin
 Project X
 NextComic First

References

External links
Official website 
 English website

Publishing companies established in 1990
Manga distributors
Japanese companies established in 1990
Book publishing companies in Tokyo
Comic book publishing companies in Tokyo
Magazine publishing companies in Tokyo